Fusion 360 is a commercial computer-aided design (CAD), computer-aided manufacturing (CAM),  computer-aided engineering (CAE) and printed circuit board (PCB) design software application, developed by Autodesk. It is available for Windows and macOS, with simplified applications available for Android and iOS. Fusion 360 is licensed as a paid subscription, with a free limited home-based, non-commercial personal edition available.

History 

Fusion 360 was introduced by Autodesk on September 24, 2013. It incorporated many features from Inventor Fusion, which it replaced.

After release, other Autodesk products were integrated in Fusion 360:

 In 2017, the Slicer feature of Autodesk 123D was integrated.
 In 2021, Autodesk Meshmixer was discontinued, after functionality was integrated into Fusion 360
 In 2021, Netfabb was merged into Fusion 360

Features
Fusion 360 has built-in capabilities to do 3D modeling, simulation and documentation. It can manage manufacturing processes such as machining, milling, turning and additive manufacturing. It also has electronic design automation (EDA) features, such as schema design, PCB design and component management.

Extensions
Autodesk offers a number of paid extensions that add extra functionality to Fusion 360:
 Simulation
 Generative Design
 Machining
 Nesting & Fabrication
 Product Design
 Manage
 Additive Build

See also
 Autodesk Inventor
 Comparison of computer-aided design software
 FreeCAD – cross-platform, free and open source 3D CAD
 Autodesk Fusion Electronics (EAGLE)

References

External links

 

Autodesk products
2013 software
Computer-aided design software
Computer-aided design software for Windows
MacOS computer-aided design software
Android (operating system) software
IOS software